Sirwan may refer to:

 Sirwan River / Diyala River
Sirwan, Iran
Sirwan, Yemen